Dragoș Vodă National College may refer to one of two high schools in Romania:

Dragoș Vodă National College (Câmpulung Moldovenesc)
Dragoș Vodă National College (Sighetu Marmației)